Clementi Woods Park is a community park in Singapore that is situated at Clementi Road next to Kent Vale, and along West Coast Road next to West Coast Plaza.

It has served as an outdoor classroom for Ngee Ann Polytechnic students since 2007.

See also
List of parks in Singapore

References

External links
National Parks Board
Clementi Woods Park

Parks in Singapore